Tanzwut is the first full-length studio album by the German industrial rock/medieval metal band Tanzwut. It was released on 1 March 1999 by EMI Music.

Track listing
 "Exkremento" − 3:42
 "Im Rausch" − 3:43
 "Königreich" − 4:10 (Saskia von Klitzing − drums)
 "Das Schicksal" − 4:08
 "Verrückt" (album version) − 3:53
 "Augen zu" − 4:10 (Saskia von Klitzing − drums, Monique Maasen − vocals)
 "Auferstehung" − 5:27 (Mediæval Bæbes − vocals)
 "Eisenmann" − 5:35 (Music and lyrics written and composed by Bill Ward, Geezer Butler, Ozzy Osbourne, Tony Iommi)
 "Erinnerung" − 3:52
 "Die Balz" − 4:09
 "Komm her" − 6:04

Personnel

Band
 Teufel − vocals
 Koll A. − bagpipes, flute (shawm)
 Castus − backing vocals, violin (hurdy-gurdy), bagpipes, flute (shawm)
 Wim − bagpipes, flute (shawm)
 Brandan − bass, bagpipes

Other
 Assistant producer - Chris Gardiner
 Programmed by Tec (track 4)
 Music and lyrics composed and written by Tanzwut (tracks 1–7 and 9–11).
 Choir of "Auferstehung" recorded at Master Rock Studios, London.
 Mastered at Skyline Studios, Düsseldorf, Germany.
 The lyrics of "Eisenmann" translated into German by Tanzwut.

1999 debut albums
Tanzwut albums